Simon Taylor (born 13 December 1970) is a former Australian rules footballer who played two games for Collingwood in the Victorian Football League (VFL) in 1989. 

He was recruited from the Montmorency Football Club in the Diamond Valley Football League. He never played a senior game for Fitzroy, but was appoint coach of the revived Fitzroy Football Club when they entered the D-Grade section of the Victorian Amateur Football Association in 2009.

References

External links

Living people
1970 births
Collingwood Football Club players
Montmorency Football Club players
Australian rules footballers from Victoria (Australia)